Pretenders may refer to:

 The Pretenders, a rock band
 Pretenders (album), the 1980 debut album by the group
 Pretenders (TV series), a 1972 British television series
 The Pretenders (play) (Norwegian: Kongs-Emnerne), an 1863 play by Henrik Ibsen
 The Pretenders (novel), a 1962 novel by F. Sionil José. 
 Pretenders, aspiring gods in the strategy game Dominions: Priests, Prophets and Pretenders and sequels
 The Pretenders (2018 film), an American drama film
 The Pretenders (1981 film), a Dutch film
 The Pretenders (1916 film), a lost American silent film

See also
 Pretender (disambiguation)